The 57th Academy Awards were presented March 25, 1985, at the Dorothy Chandler Pavilion, Los Angeles. Jack Lemmon presided over the ceremonies. This ceremony marked the first time that multiple black nominees would win an Oscar, when Prince and Stevie Wonder won for their respective work on Purple Rain and The Woman in Red. Additionally, it was the only time that all five nominees in Best Original Song topped the Billboard Hot 100 chart.

Amadeus won eight awards, including Best Picture. Other winners included The Killing Fields with three awards, A Passage to India and Places in the Heart with two, and Charade, Dangerous Moves, Indiana Jones and the Temple of Doom, Purple Rain, The Stone Carvers, The Times of Harvey Milk, Up, and The Woman in Red with one.

While presenting the Best Picture award, Laurence Olivier forgot to list the nominees and simply tore open the envelope to declare: "Amadeus!". Upon accepting the award on the film's behalf, producer Saul Zaentz had the presence of mind to mention the other Best Picture nominees during his speech to make up for Olivier's flub.

Awards

Nominees were announced on February 6, 1985. Winners are listed first, highlighted in boldface and indicated with a double dagger.

Honorary Academy Awards
 James Stewart "for his fifty years of memorable performances. For his high ideals both on and off the screen. With the respect and affection of his colleagues."
 National Endowment for the Arts "in recognition of its 20th anniversary and its dedicated commitment to fostering artistic and creative activity and excellence in every area of the arts."

Jean Hersholt Humanitarian Award
 David L. Wolper

Special Achievement Academy Award
 The River – Kay Rose for Sound Effects Editing

Presenters and performers

The following persons, listed in order of appearance, presented awards or performed musical numbers.

Presenters

Performers

Multiple nominations and awards

These films had multiple nominations:

11 nominations: Amadeus and A Passage to India
7 nominations: The Killing Fields and Places in the Heart
5 nominations: 2010: The Year We Make Contact and The River
4 nominations: The Natural
3 nominations: Greystoke: The Legend of Tarzan, Lord of the Apes and A Soldier's Story
2 nominations: The Bostonians, Broadway Danny Rose, The Cotton Club, Footloose, Ghostbusters, Indiana Jones and the Temple of Doom and Under the Volcano

The following films received multiple awards.

8 wins: Amadeus
3 wins: The Killing Fields
2 wins: A Passage to India and Places in the Heart

See also
42nd Golden Globe Awards
5th Golden Raspberry Awards
1984 in film
 Submissions for the 57th Academy Award for Best Foreign Film
 27th Grammy Awards
 36th Primetime Emmy Awards
 37th Primetime Emmy Awards
 38th British Academy Film Awards
 39th Tony Awards

References

External links

Academy Awards ceremonies
1984 film awards
1985 in Los Angeles
1985 in American cinema
March 1985 events in the United States
Academy
Television shows directed by Marty Pasetta